IFX may refer to:

 IFX AG or Infineon Technologies AG, a German semiconductor manufacturer
 KFX/IFX, a joint South Korean and Indonesian program to develop a fighter jet
 IFX Piranha, video software for Linux
 Clarisse IFX, a propriety 3D rendering software
 IFX, International Flight Training Academy ICAO code
 Interactive Financial Exchange (IFX), a financial data transfer file format
 IFX Markets, a trading name of City Index Group

See also 
 FX (disambiguation)